Erie Bluffs State Park is a  Pennsylvania state park in Girard and Springfield Townships, Erie County, Pennsylvania in the United States. The park is the largest undeveloped stretch of land overlooking Lake Erie in Pennsylvania. It is one of Pennsylvania's newest state parks.

The park is 1 of 5 Pennsylvania State Parks that are in the path of totality for the 2024 solar eclipse, with 3 minutes and 44 seconds of totality.

Ecology
Most of the Lake Erie coastline in Pennsylvania is highly developed. Erie Bluffs State Park is the largest undeveloped stretch of coastline in Pennsylvania. It is therefore highly prized as an example of the wild nature that once stretched up and down the coast of Lake Erie.

The Pennsylvania Department of Conservation and Natural Resources in cooperation with the Western Pennsylvania Conservancy conducted a biological survey in the summer of 2004 at Erie Bluffs State Park. Their goal was to survey the forests, streams, and beaches of the park for every species of wild bird, fish, reptile, mammal, amphibian, plant, and insect that they could find. Biologists from Carnegie Museum, Shippensburg University of Pennsylvania, Gannon University, the Cleveland Museum of Natural History, the Pennsylvania Game Commission, the Pennsylvania Fish and Boat Commission, the Western Pennsylvania Conservancy and the Pennsylvania Department of Environmental Protection took part in the survey and found:
 80 species of birds in the park included two bald eagles, a cerulean and hooded warbler, and an Acadian flycatcher.
 a colony of more than 3,000 bank swallow found nesting in the bluffs is believed to be one of the largest colonies of bank swallows in Pennsylvania
 19 species of mammals, including white-tailed deer and red and gray foxes. The mammalogists noted that they did not find any Norway rats or house mice. This is significant because both animals are alien to the area and would only be present due to development by man.
 4 species of bats, including the European pipistrel, little brown bat, big brown bat and the red bat.
 302 species of vascular plants and 92 species of fungi
 Entomologists found 477 taxa of land-dwelling insects, 172 species of butterflies and moths and 32 taxa of spiders.
 33 species of land snails, 13 species of aquatic snails and mussels including the invasive zebra mussel
 14 different reptiles and amphibians
 7 species of fish

History

Erie Bluffs State Park was officially established as a Pennsylvania State Park on June 4, 2004. It became Pennsylvania's 117th state park. Pennsylvania Governor Edward G. Rendell stated, at the opening of the park, 

The land on which Erie Bluffs State Park is located was acquired in 2004 by the Western Pennsylvania Conservancy from Reliant Energy. The conservancy then turned over ownership of the parklands to the Commonwealth of Pennsylvania, to be managed by the Pennsylvania Department of Conservation and Natural Resources.

Nearby state parks
The following state parks are within  of Erie Bluffs State Park:
Presque Isle State Park (Erie County)
Pymatuning State Park (Crawford County)
Pymatuning State Park (Ohio)
Geneva State Park (Ohio)

See also

 Erie Triangle

References

External links

State parks of Pennsylvania
Protected areas established in 2004
Parks in Erie County, Pennsylvania
2004 establishments in Pennsylvania
Protected areas of Erie County, Pennsylvania